Sandra L. Townsend (born December 25, 1936 in Buffalo, Oklahoma) was an American politician who was a Republican member of the New Mexico House of Representatives from 1995 to 2007. She was Clerk and Chief Deputy of San Juan County, New Mexico from 1967 to 1991.

References

1936 births
Living people
People from Harper County, Oklahoma
People from Aztec, New Mexico
Women state legislators in New Mexico
Republican Party members of the New Mexico House of Representatives
21st-century American women
Politicians from Oklahoma